This article lists all 190 census-designated places in the U.S. State of Massachusetts.

List

References 

Lists of census-designated places in the United States
Lists of places in Massachusetts
Census-designated places in Massachusetts